Akram Al-Worafi (born November 12, 1986) is a Yemeni football midfielder.

Honours

Club
Al-Sha'ab Ibb'

Yemeni League: 2
2002–03, 2003–04 
Yemeni President Cup: 2
2002, 2003
Yemeni September 26 Cup: 1
2002

Country
Yemen U17
FIFA U-17 World Cup
Group Stage: 2003
 AFC U-17 Championship
Runner-up: 2002 AFC U-17 Championship

References

External links 

1986 births
Living people
Yemeni footballers
Yemeni expatriate footballers
Yemen international footballers
Association football midfielders
Al Sha'ab Ibb players
Al-Oruba (Yemeni) players
Al-Hilal Al-Sahili players
Al-Saqr SC players
Al-Bahri players
Yemeni expatriate sportspeople in Iraq
Expatriate footballers in Iraq
Yemeni League players